Polyglycolide or poly(glycolic acid) (PGA), also spelled as polyglycolic acid, is a biodegradable, thermoplastic polymer and the simplest linear, aliphatic polyester. It can be prepared starting from glycolic acid by means of polycondensation or ring-opening polymerization. PGA has been known since 1954 as a tough fiber-forming polymer.  Owing to its hydrolytic instability, however, its use has initially been limited. Currently polyglycolide and its copolymers (poly(lactic-co-glycolic acid) with lactic acid, poly(glycolide-co-caprolactone) with ε-caprolactone and poly (glycolide-co-trimethylene carbonate) with trimethylene carbonate) are widely used as a material for the synthesis of absorbable sutures and are being evaluated in the biomedical field.

Physical properties
Polyglycolide has a glass transition temperature between 35 and 40 °C and its melting point is reported to be in the range of 225 to 230 °C. PGA also exhibits an elevated degree of crystallinity, around 45–55%, thus resulting in insolubility in water. The solubility of this polyester is somewhat unusual, in that its high molecular weight form is insoluble in almost all common organic solvents (acetone, dichloromethane, chloroform, ethyl acetate, tetrahydrofuran), while low molecular weight oligomers sufficiently differ in their physical properties to be more soluble. However, polyglycolide is soluble in highly fluorinated solvents like hexafluoroisopropanol (HFIP) and hexafluoroacetone sesquihydrate, that can be used to prepare solutions of the high MW polymer for melt spinning and film preparation. Fibers of PGA exhibit high strength and modulus (7 GPa) and are particularly stiff.

Synthesis
Polyglycolide can be obtained through several different processes starting with different materials:

 polycondensation of glycolic acid;
 ring-opening polymerization of glycolide;
 solid-state polycondensation of halogenoacetates

Polycondensation of glycolic acid is the simplest process available to prepare PGA, but it is not the most efficient because it yields a low molecular weight product. Briefly, the procedure is as follows: glycolic acid is heated at atmospheric pressure and a temperature of about 175 to 185 °C is maintained until water ceases to distill. Subsequently, pressure is reduced to 150 mm Hg, still keeping the temperature unaltered for about two hours and the low MW polyglycolide is obtained.

The most common synthesis used to produce a high molecular weight form of the polymer is ring-opening polymerization of "glycolide", the cyclic diester of glycolic acid. Glycolide can be prepared by heating under reduced pressure low MW PGA, collecting the diester by means of distillation. Ring-opening polymerization of glycolide can be catalyzed using different catalysts, including antimony compounds, such as antimony trioxide or antimony trihalides, zinc compounds (zinc lactate) and tin compounds like stannous octoate (tin(II) 2-ethylhexanoate) or tin alkoxides. Stannous octoate is the most commonly used initiator, since it is approved by the FDA as a food stabilizer. Usage of other catalysts has been disclosed as well, among these are aluminium isopropoxide, calcium acetylacetonate, and several lanthanide alkoxides (e.g. yttrium isopropoxide). The procedure followed for ring-opening polymerization is briefly outlined: a catalytic amount of initiator is added to glycolide under a nitrogen atmosphere at a temperature of 195 °C. The reaction is allowed to proceed for about two hours, then temperature is raised to 230 °C for about half an hour. After solidification the resulting high MW polymer is collected.

Another procedure consists in the thermally induced solid-state polycondensation of halogenoacetates with general formula
X-—CH2COO−M+ (where M is a monovalent metal like sodium and X is a halogen like chlorine), resulting in the production of polyglycolide and small crystals of a salt. Polycondensation is carried out by heating an halogenoacetate, like sodium chloroacetate, at a temperature between 160 and 180 °C, continuously passing nitrogen through the reaction vessel. During the reaction polyglycolide is formed along with sodium chloride which precipitates within the polymeric matrix; the salt can be conveniently removed by washing the product of the reaction with water.

PGA can also be obtained by reacting carbon monoxide, formaldehyde or one of its related compounds like paraformaldehyde or trioxane, in presence of an acidic catalyst. In a carbon monoxide atmosphere an autoclave is loaded with the catalyst (chlorosulfonic acid), dichloromethane and trioxane, then it is charged with carbon monoxide until a specific pressure is reached; the reaction is stirred and allowed to proceed at a temperature of about 180 °C for two hours. Upon completion the unreacted carbon monoxide is discharged and a mixture of low and high MW polyglycolide is collected.

Degradation
Polyglycolide is characterized by hydrolytic instability owing to the presence of the ester linkage in its backbone. The degradation process is erosive and appears to take place in two steps during which the polymer is converted back to its monomer glycolic acid: first water diffuses into the amorphous (non-crystalline) regions of the polymer matrix, cleaving the ester bonds; the second step starts after the amorphous regions have been eroded, leaving the crystalline portion of the polymer susceptible to hydrolytic attack. Upon collapse of the crystalline regions the polymer chain dissolves.

When exposed to physiological conditions, polyglycolide is degraded by random hydrolysis, and apparently it is also broken down by certain enzymes, especially those with esterase activity. The degradation product, glycolic acid, is nontoxic, but like ethylene glycol, it is metabolized to oxalic acid, which could make it dangerous. A part of the glycolic acid is also excreted by urine.

Studies undergone using polyglycolide-made sutures have shown that the material loses half of its strength after two weeks and 100% after four weeks. The polymer is completely resorbed by the organism in a time frame of four to six months. Degradation is faster in vivo than in vitro, this phenomenon thought to be due to cellular enzymatic activity.

Uses

While known since 1954, PGA had found little use because of its sensitivity to hydrolysis when compared with other synthetic polymers. However, in 1962 this polymer was used to develop the first synthetic absorbable suture which was marketed under the tradename of Dexon by the Davis & Geck subsidiary of the American Cyanamid Corporation. After its coating with polycaprolactone and calcium stearate it is being sold under the brand name of Assucryl.

PGA suture is classified as a synthetic, absorbable, braided multifilament. It is coated with N-laurin and L-lysine, which render the thread extremely smooth, soft and safe for knotting. It is also coated with magnesium stearate and finally sterilized with ethylene oxide gas. It is naturally degraded in the body by hydrolysis and is absorbed as water-soluble monomers, completed between 60 and 90 days. Elderly, anemic and malnourished patients may absorb the suture more quickly. Its color is either violet or undyed and it is sold in sizes USP 6-0 (1 metric) to USP 2 (5 metric). It has the advantages of high initial tensile strength, smooth passage through tissue, easy handling, excellent knotting ability, and secure knot tying. It is commonly used for subcutaneous sutures, intracutaneous closures, abdominal and thoracic surgeries.

The traditional role of PGA as a biodegradable suture material has led to its evaluation in other biomedical fields. Implantable medical devices have been produced with PGA, including anastomosis rings, pins, rods, plates and screws. It has also been explored for tissue engineering or controlled drug delivery. Tissue engineering scaffolds made with polyglycolide have been produced following different approaches, but generally most of these are obtained through textile technologies in the form of non-woven felts.

The Kureha Chemical Industries has commercialized high molecular weight polyglycolide for food packaging applications under the tradename of Kuredux. Production is at Belle, West Virginia, with an intended capacity of 4000 annual metric tons. Its attributes as a barrier material result from its high degree of crystallization, the basis for a tortuous path mechanism for low permeability.  It is anticipated that the high molecular weight version will have use as an interlayer between layers of polyethylene terephthalate to provide improved barrier protection for perishable foods, including carbonated beverages and foods that lose freshness on prolonged exposure to air.  Thinner plastic bottles which still retain desirable barrier properties may also be enabled by this polyglycolide interlayer technology. A low molecular weight version (approximately 600 amu) is available from The Chemours Company (formerly part of DuPont) and is purported to be useful in oil and gas applications.

References

Biodegradable plastics
Biomaterials
Polyesters
Surgical suture material
Thermoplastics